Jankov is a municipality and village in Benešov District in the Central Bohemian Region of the Czech Republic. It has about 900 inhabitants.

Administrative parts

Villages of Bedřichovice, Čečkov, Čestín, Jankovská Lhota, Nosákov, Odlochovice, Otradovice, Pičín and Podolí are administrative parts of Jankov.

History
The Battle of Jankau was fought nearby on 6 March 1645, during the 1618 to 1648 Thirty Years' War. It featured a Swedish army under Lennart Torstensson and an Imperial force commanded by von Hatzfeldt. Both contained around 16,000 troops, but the more experienced and better equipped Swedes won a crushing victory; the Imperial army suffered 5,000 casualties and lost 4,650 prisoners.

References

Villages in Benešov District